Robert Pavlicek (31 May 1912 – 22 January 1982) was an Austrian footballer. He played in six matches for the Austria national football team from 1933 to 1935.

References

External links
 

1912 births
1982 deaths
Austrian footballers
Austria international footballers
Place of birth missing
Association footballers not categorized by position